The Design 1037 ship (full name Emergency Fleet Corporation Design 1037) was a steel-hulled cargo ship design approved for production by the United States Shipping Boards Emergency Fleet Corporation (EFT) in World War I. A total of 48 ships were ordered and completed from 1918 to 1920. The ships were constructed at three yards: Doullut & Williams Shipbuilding Company of New Orleans, Louisiana, Federal Shipbuilding Company of Kearney, New Jersey, and George A. Fuller & Company of Wilmington, North Carolina.

References

Bibliography

External links
 EFC Design 1037: Illustrations

Standard ship types of the United States
 
Design 1037 ships of the United States Navy